A business day means any day except any Saturday, any Sunday, or  any day which is a legal holiday or any day on which banking institutions are authorized or required by law or other governmental action to close.

The definition of a business day varies by region. It depends on the local workweek which is dictated by local customs, religions, and business operations. For example, in the United States and much of the Western world, they are typically Monday through Friday from 9a.m. to 5p.m. By contrast, for many eastern countries such as Japan, the normal business day is Monday through Friday from 8:30a.m. to 7p.m.

The length of a business day varies by era, by region, by industry, and by company. Prevalent norms have included the 8-hour day and the 10-hour day, but various lengths, from 4 to 16 hours, have been normal in certain times and places.

Business days are commonly used by couriers when determining the arrival date of a package. If a courier ships a parcel on a Thursday that will be delivered in "two business days", it will arrive on the following Monday if neither Friday nor Monday are holidays.

In finance, how business days are defined are called business day conventions and determine how payments are settled on contracts such as interest rate swaps.

Shifts and trends
The introduction of flex time introduces the internet as a more easily globalized and offshored workforce. The notion of a business day has come under a certain degree of challenge. Information-based companies with a limited dependence on physical goods have less of a need to distinguish a weekend day from a weekday. Indeed, to many, there is no difference at all. These companies construe a business day to be any day on which they provide service.

Some businesses conduct business transactions and operations on a 24/7 basis due to the nature of the field. Such  businesses include hotels, hospitals, police and fire departments, gas stations, and airports.

With the introduction of flex time, the significance of the traditional business day is declining. Although the 8-hour work day still remains as a standard for many industries, this trend is expected to decline further during the coming years.

German-speaking countries
In Germany, Austria and Switzerland, two German words of somewhat different meaning are used to describe business or working days. One is Werktag, a legal term applied to all calendar days except Sundays and public holidays; it includes most Saturdays. Werktage are days on which businesses such as retail shops and institutions such as schools are generally allowed to operate (see also Ladenschlussgesetz). In contrast, Arbeitstag refers to a day on which someone actually works. For most employees, these are Monday to Friday. However, for example, a firefighter might have an Arbeitstag on Sunday even though it is legally not a Werktag.

See also
Calendar day
Day count convention
Workweek and weekend

References

Working time